Potamanthus is a genus of hacklegilled burrower mayflies in the family Potamanthidae. There are about 13 described species in Potamanthus.

Species
These 13 species belong to the genus Potamanthus:

 Potamanthus formosus Eaton, 1892 c g
 Potamanthus huoshanensis Wu, 1987 c g
 Potamanthus idiocerus Bae & McCafferty, 1991 c g
 Potamanthus kwangsiensis (Hsu, 1937) c g
 Potamanthus longitibius Bae & McCafferty, 1991 c g
 Potamanthus luteus (Linnaeus, 1767) i c g
 Potamanthus macrophthalmus (You, 1984) c g
 Potamanthus nanchangi (Hsu, 1936) c g
 Potamanthus sabahensis (Bae & McCafferty, 1990) c g
 Potamanthus sangangensis (You, 1984) c g
 Potamanthus subcostalis Navás, 1932 c g
 Potamanthus yooni Bae & McCafferty, 1991 c g
 Potamanthus yunnanensis (You, Wu, Gui & Hsu, 1982) c g

Data sources: i = ITIS, c = Catalogue of Life, g = GBIF, b = Bugguide.net

References

External links

 

Mayflies